Henry Paull (1824–1898) was a British Conservative Party politician, and barrister.

The son of Archibald Paull of Devonshire Place, Paull entered Middle Temple in 1845, and was appointed Deputy Lieutenant of Middlesex in 1859.

With Liberal-Conservative principles, Paull was elected Conservative MP for St Ives at the 1857 general election and held the seat until 1868 when he stood down.

References

External links
 

UK MPs 1857–1859
UK MPs 1859–1865
UK MPs 1865–1868
1824 births
1898 deaths
Conservative Party (UK) MPs for English constituencies
Deputy Lieutenants of Middlesex
Members of the Parliament of the United Kingdom for St Ives
Members of the Middle Temple